Puerto Rico Highway 821 (PR-821) is a road located in Corozal, Puerto Rico. It begins at its intersection with PR-891 in downtown Corozal, passing through Abras barrio until its terminus at PR-630 near Mavilla barrio of Vega Alta municipality.

Major intersections

See also

 List of highways numbered 821

References

External links
 

821
Roads in Corozal, Puerto Rico